Ye Mibaya was a principal queen of King Binnya Waru of Hanthawaddy. She was most likely the king's chief queen consort since the 1485/86 Shwedagon Pagada inscriptions by King Dhammazedi list King Binnya Waru and Queen Ye as the royal donors at the pagoda.

Notes

References

Bibliography
 
 

Queens consort of Hanthawaddy